Bruce Walker was a wide receiver in the Canadian Football League playing 6 seasons with the Ottawa Rough Riders.

A graduate of University of Windsor, Walker joined the Riders in 1979. He played in the famous Grey Cup classic in 1981. His career totals were 149 passes caught for 1828 yards. In 1984, his last season, he won the prestigious Tom Pate Memorial Award.

References

1955 births
Living people
Ottawa Rough Riders players
University of Windsor alumni
Windsor Lancers football players